Sean Horan is a New Zealand rugby union and sevens coach. He coached the New Zealand women's national rugby sevens team. He was appointed as head coach in 2012. He previously coached the Bay of Plenty Steamers, in the ITM Cup, from 2009, till his rather shocking departure in 2011.

Horan's first achievement as head coach was winning the 2013 Rugby World Cup Sevens in Russia. In 2016, he helped New Zealand qualify for the 2016 Summer Olympics. He stepped down as coach for the New Zealand women's sevens team after the 2016 Olympics.

References

Year of birth missing (living people)
Living people
New Zealand rugby union coaches
Rugby sevens in New Zealand
New Zealand Olympic coaches
New Zealand national rugby sevens team coaches